The Avante! Festival is an annual cultural festival held during the first weekend of September. It was started in 1976 by the Portuguese Communist Party and is named after the party's official newspaper, Avante!

After taking part in different locations around Lisbon, like the Feira Internacional de Lisboa, Ajuda and Loures, the festival is now held in Amora, a town near Seixal in a ground bought by the party after a massive fundraising campaign in the early 90s. The campaign was considered by the party as the only way to avoid the boycott organised by the owners of the previous festivals grounds, that culminated in 1987 with the festival not having been held after 11 editions. The festival usually sees hundreds of thousands of visitors, making the outside of the ground appear like a gigantic camping park. The festival consists of a three-day music festival, with the participation of hundreds of Portuguese and international bands and artists in five different stages, ethnography, gastronomy, debates, a book & music fair, theatre (Avanteatro), cinema (Cineavante) and sporting events. Several foreign communist parties also participate.

In 28 editions, the festival has hosted several famous artists, Portuguese and foreign, like Chico Buarque, Baden Powell, Ivan Lins, Buffy Sainte-Marie, Holly Near, Johnny Clegg, Charlie Haden, Judy Collins, Richie Havens, Tom Paxton, The Soviet Circus Company, the Kuban Cossacks Choir, Dexys Midnight Runners,  The Band, Hevia, Adriano Correia de Oliveira, Carlos Paredes, Jorge Palma, Manoel de Oliveira and many others.

The preparation of the festival begins right after the end of the previous festival. Hundreds of party members and their friends, mostly young people, volunteer for the hard work of building a small town in a few months. 

The Avante! Festival has the capacity for over 100,000 people. It tends to be at full capacity during the days of the festival.

Gallery

External links 
 

Communist press festivals
Portuguese Communist Party
Music festivals in Portugal
1976 establishments in Portugal
Annual events in Portugal
Seixal
Music festivals established in 1976
Autumn events in Portugal